The list of ship launches in 1948 includes a chronological list of all ships launched in 1948.



References

Sources

1948
Ship launches